The Stardust Breakthrough Performance Award (Female) is given as a part of the Stardust Awards, which are held annually to recognise upcoming talent in Bollywood. This award is given to the actress who has made her impact felt that particular year, by her performance thus resulting in a successful breakthrough in her career. The first award in this category was given in 2005. As of 2015, it has been changed to Stardust Award for Breakthrough Performance Supporting - Female. Here is a list of the award winners and the films for which they won. The first award in this category was given in 2005. As of 2015, it has been changed to Stardust Award for Breakthrough Supporting Performance - Female.

The winners of this award are:

References

Stardust Awards